José Luis Susé Cuesta (born 1924), known as "José Colás", is a Cuban former Negro league outfielder who played in the 1940s. 

A native of Havana, Cuba, Colás is the younger brother of fellow-Negro leaguer Carlos Colás. He played in the Mexican League prior to making his Negro leagues debut with the Memphis Red Sox in 1947. Colás continued to play for Memphis through 1951, and was selected to the East–West All-Star Game in 1947, 1948 and 1951. He went on to play minor league baseball in the 1950s with such clubs as the Scranton Miners and the Mount Vernon Kings.

References

External links
 and Seamheads

1924 births
Possibly living people
Memphis Red Sox players
Baseball outfielders
Baseball players from Havana
Azules de Veracruz players
Tuneros de San Luis Potosí players
Scranton Miners players
Brandon Greys players
Mount Vernon Kings players
Cuban expatriates in Mexico
Cuban expatriates in the United States